Annington may refer to:

Annington, West Sussex, a hamlet in England
 Annington (Poolesville, Maryland), US